Huddersfield Town's 1943–44 campaign saw Town continuing to play in the Wartime League. They finished 6th in the 1st NRL Competition, 37th in the War Cup qualifiers and 32nd in the 2nd NRL Competition.

Results

1st NRL Competition

2nd NRL Competition
The first 10 matches of this competition took part in the War Cup qualifiers. The last 10 matches took place in the Combined Counties Cup.

1943-44
English football clubs 1943–44 season